The year 1730 in architecture involved some significant events.

Buildings and structures

Buildings

 Annenhof Palace in the Lefortovo District of Moscow, designed by Francesco Bartolomeo Rastrelli.
 The Column of Victory at Blenheim Palace in England, designed by Roger Morris and Henry Herbert, is completed.
 Zeughaus (arsenal, modern-day Deutsches Historisches Museum) on Unter den Linden in Berlin (Prussia), to a design originated by Johann Arnold Nering in 1695 (the year of his death) and continued successively by Martin Grünberg, Andreas Schlüter and Jean de Bodt, is completed.
 Senate House (University of Cambridge), designed by James Gibbs and James Burrough, is completed.
 St Anne's Limehouse, designed by Nicholas Hawksmoor, and St Paul's, Deptford, designed by Thomas Archer, are completed for the Commission for Building Fifty New Churches in London; and Hawksmoor's St. George's, Bloomsbury, is consecrated.
 Approximate date – Clothiers' houses in Fore Street, Trowbridge, England – No. 64 and No. 70 (Parade House) – are built.

Births
February 6 – Januarius Zick, German painter and architect (d. 1797)
February 22 – Domenico Merlini, Polish-Italian architect (d. 1797)
date unknown – Marie-Joseph Peyre, French architect (d. 1785)

Deaths
 December 31 – Carlo Gimach, Maltese architect, engineer and poet (b. 1651)
date unknown – Leonardo de Figueroa, Spanish architect (b. c.1650)

References

architecture
Years in architecture
18th-century architecture